Turkey participated at the 2009 World Games in Kaohsiung, Taiwan, from July 16, 2009 to July 26, 2009.

Competitors

Medal summary

Medal table

Medalists

Results by event

Beach handball

Men

Boules sports

Lyonnaise

Women

Raffa

Women

Karate

Kumite

Men

Kumite

Women

2009 in Turkish sport
Nations at the 2009 World Games
2009